Aziz Efendi may refer to:

 Giritli Ali Aziz Efendi (1749–1798), Ottoman ambassador and author of Muhayyelat
 Hattat Aziz Efendi (1871–1934), Turkish calligrapher